Penn Street station is a SEPTA Route 102 trolley stop in Clifton Heights, Pennsylvania. It is officially located near Penn Street and Broadway Avenue, although the actual location on Penn Street is halfway between Broadway and Berkley Avenues. Because the station runs through a residential neighborhood, no parking is available.

Trolleys arriving at this station travel between 69th Street Terminal in Upper Darby, Pennsylvania and Sharon Hill, Pennsylvania. The tracks cross all three of the streets mentioned above.  They run directly south before curving to the southwest as they cross the intersection of Broadway Avenue and Ogden Street. At Penn Street itself, there are two platforms, one on the northeast corner of the crossing, and another on the southwest corner of the crossing. The southwest platform runs in front of a small children's playground on the northwest corner of Penn Street and Berkley Avenue, and contains a small open acrylic glass shelter. The tracks cross Berkley Avenue east of the intersection of a cul-de-sac, before leaving the right-of-way to run along Springfield Road.

Station layout

References

External links

1999 Fantrip photo @ Broadway Avenue & Ogden Street (World-NYC Subway.org)
 Station from Penn Street from Google Maps Street View; August 2008

SEPTA Media–Sharon Hill Line stations